The 1994 United States House of Representatives election in Montana were held on November 8, 1994, to determine who will represent the state of Montana in the United States House of Representatives. Montana has one, at large district in the House, apportioned according to the 1990 United States Census, due to its low population. Representatives are elected for two-year terms. , this was the last time that a Democrat won a House seat in Montana.

General Election

Results

References 

1994 Montana elections
Montana
1994